Sulfometuron methyl is an organic compound used as a herbicide.  It is classed as a sulfonylurea. It functions via the inhibitition of acetolactate synthase enzyme, which catalyses the first step in biosynthesis of the branched-chain amino acids valine, leucine and isoleucine.

References 

Benzenesulfonylureas
Herbicides